Panola Township is located in Woodford County, Illinois at T27N, R2E. As of the 2010 census, its population was 353 and it contained 144 housing units. Panola Township and Minonk Township (T28N, R2E) were originally the same township, but formed two new townships on an unknown date.

Geography

Demographics

References

External links
City-data.com
Illinois State Archives

Townships in Woodford County, Illinois
Peoria metropolitan area, Illinois
Townships in Illinois